Nathaniel Edwin Clyne (born 5 April 1991) is an English professional footballer who plays as a right-back for Premier League club Crystal Palace.

Clyne began his career at Crystal Palace, playing regularly in four Championship seasons, before a move to Southampton in 2012, where he spent three seasons in the Premier League and racked up 104 matches and scored five goals in all competitions. He joined Liverpool in July 2015 for a fee of £12.5 million. After having amassed 103 appearances and two goals, he left Liverpool in July 2020 as a free agent. Clyne re-joined former club Crystal Palace in October 2020.

Formerly an international at under-19 and under-21 level, Clyne made his senior international debut for England in November 2014. He was selected for Euro 2016 and made a total of 14 appearances for his country.

Club career

Crystal Palace
Clyne was born in Stockwell, Greater London. He made his first-team debut for Crystal Palace in a 3–0 Championship win against Barnsley at Selhurst Park on 18 October 2008. He signed a three-year professional contract with the club two days later, with manager Neil Warnock stating that Clyne "has a bright future in the game". His first career goal came on 8 December 2009, when he opened the scoring in a 4–2 win at Reading in the seventh minute. In February 2010 he was offered a move to Premier League club Wolverhampton Wanderers, but rejected it without even entering talks with manager Mick McCarthy.

In the 2010–11 season, Clyne was the youngest player in the Football League to play every single match of that campaign, and won Crystal Palace's Player of the Year award.

Southampton

On 19 July 2012, Clyne signed a four-year deal with newly promoted Premier League club Southampton. He made his debut on 19 August, in a 3–2 defeat against Manchester City at the City of Manchester Stadium. His first match at St Mary's came six days later in a 0–2 defeat by Wigan Athletic. He scored his first goal for the club on 22 September, in a 4–1 win at home against Aston Villa, set up by Gastón Ramírez with England under-21 coach Stuart Pearce in attendance at St Mary's. His second goal for the club came in the FA Cup third round against Burnley on 4 January 2014, opening an eventual 4–3 home victory with a 25-yard strike past Tom Heaton.

Clyne scored in Southampton's first match of the 2014–15 season, a 2–1 defeat against Liverpool at Anfield on 17 August. He scored his second goal of the campaign on 23 September, with a long-range effort which gave Southampton a 2–1 victory at Arsenal in the League Cup third round. On 24 November, he finished Ryan Bertrand's 81st-minute cross to earn a 1–1 draw away to Aston Villa.

Liverpool
On 1 July 2015, Liverpool confirmed the signing of Clyne from Southampton for £12.5 million on a five-year contract, with his former club, Crystal Palace receiving a payment of £2.5M. Clyne made his debut in a Liverpool shirt against the True Thai Premier League All Stars in Bangkok on 14 July as part of the club's pre-season tour. He made his competitive debut on 9 August in a 1–0 away win against Stoke City in the first match of the 2015–16 Premier League season. On 28 October, Clyne scored his first Liverpool goal in a 1–0 League Cup fourth round victory over AFC Bournemouth; the team's first win under Jürgen Klopp. His first league goal came on 14 February 2016, in a 6–0 win away to Aston Villa.

In March 2016, in Liverpool's first European matches against rivals Manchester United, Clyne won a penalty that Daniel Sturridge converted in the first leg, and conceded a penalty scored by Anthony Martial in the second, as Liverpool won 3–1 on aggregate in the last 16 of the UEFA Europa League. On 18 May, he played the full 90 minutes in the final, a 3–1 loss to Sevilla in Basel.

Prior to the 2017–18 season, Clyne suffered a back injury expected to rule him out until February 2018. On 31 March 2018, having missed the entire campaign up to this point, he made his first appearance on the team sheet as an unused substitute in Liverpool's 2–1 league victory away to former club Crystal Palace. A week later on 7 April, he made his return, keeping a clean sheet in a 0–0 draw against Everton in a Merseyside derby.

Clyne joined fellow Premier League club Bournemouth on 4 January 2019 on loan for the remainder of the 2018–19 season. He made his debut the next day in a 3–1 FA Cup third round defeat at home to Brighton & Hove Albion.

On 20 July 2019, Clyne sustained an anterior cruciate ligament injury in a pre-season friendly against Borussia Dortmund. On 25 June 2020, after having made no appearances during the 2019–20 season due to continuing injury problems, Liverpool confirmed that his contract would not be renewed and Clyne would leave the club.

Return to Crystal Palace
After leaving Liverpool, Clyne trained with Crystal Palace in an attempt to regain fitness and was registered as a triallist in order to make appearances for the under-23 team. On 14 October 2020, he joined the club on a short-term contract. He made his debut ten days later in a 2–1 win at Fulham. On 25 January 2021, Clyne signed a contract extension to remain at the club until the end of the 2020–21 season.

On 6 August 2021, Clyne signed a new one-year contract with Crystal Palace and in June 2022, he signed a further contract extension keeping him at the club until 2023.

International career
Clyne was born in England and is of Grenadian descent.

On 2 October 2014, Clyne was named in the England squad for the UEFA Euro 2016 qualifiers against San Marino and Estonia later that month. He was an unused substitute in both matches. Clyne said "My aim, now, is to try to make myself first choice for Euro 2016. That's what I'm going to keep pushing for." On 15 November, he made his full international debut in a home qualifier against Slovenia, playing the full 90 minutes of a 3–1 victory. Clyne went on to establish himself as first-choice right-back for England, appearing in five of their last six qualifiers.

Personal life
Clyne has many tattoos, including of London landmarks. These include the Houses of Parliament, the London Eye and Stockwell tube station, the nearest to his childhood home.

Career statistics

Club

International

Honours
Liverpool
Football League Cup runner-up: 2015–16
UEFA Champions League runner-up: 2017–18
UEFA Europa League runner-up: 2015–16

Individual
PFA Team of the Year: 2011–12 Championship
Crystal Palace Young Player of the Season: 2008–09, 2009–10
Football League Young Player of the Year: 2010
UEFA European Under-19 Championship Technical Selection: 2010
Crystal Palace Player of the Season: 2010–11
Football League Championship Player of the Month: October 2011

References

External links

Profile at the Crystal Palace F.C. website

1991 births
Living people
Footballers from Stockwell
English footballers
Association football defenders
Crystal Palace F.C. players
Southampton F.C. players
Liverpool F.C. players
AFC Bournemouth players
English Football League players
Premier League players
England youth international footballers
England under-21 international footballers
England international footballers
UEFA Euro 2016 players
Black British sportsmen
English sportspeople of Grenadian descent